Hornsey School for Girls is the only all-girl secondary school located in the borough of Haringey, situated in the Hornsey/Crouch End area of North London.

History
The school began as a girls' grammar school the 'Hornsey High School for Girls in 1887, by the Church Schools Company (now the United Church Schools Trust). In 1915 it moved to new buildings in Weston Park. In 1971, it moved to newly built premises on Inderwick Road.

It later became a girls-only comprehensive school.

Alumni
 Zeinab Badawi, presenter of World News Today, and former presenter of Channel 4 News in the 1990s
 Julie Dorrington, medical photographer
 Dilys Laye, actress

References

External links 
 

Secondary schools in the London Borough of Haringey
Girls' schools in London
Community schools in the London Borough of Haringey
Hornsey